The Stephenson Baronetcy, of Hassop Hall in the County of Derby, is a title in the Baronetage of the United Kingdom. It was created on 16 July 1936 for the businessman and politician Henry Kenyon Stephenson. The second baronet was also a businessman and a Lieutenant-Colonel in the Territorial Army. As of 2007 the presumed third holder of the title has not successfully proven his succession and is therefore not on the official roll of the baronetage, with the baronetcy considered dormant. For more information, follow this link.

Stephenson baronets, of Hassop Hall (1936)
Sir Henry Kenyon Stephenson, 1st Baronet (1865–1947)
Sir Henry Francis Blake Stephenson, 2nd Baronet (1895–1982)
Henry Upton Stephenson, presumed 3rd Baronet (born 1926)

References

Kidd, Charles, Williamson, David (editors). Debrett's Peerage and Baronetage (1990 edition). New York: St Martin's Press, 1990.

Stephenson